Boissy-sous-Saint-Yon (literally Boissy under Saint-Yon) is a commune in the Essonne department in Île-de-France in northern France.

Inhabitants of Boissy-sous-Saint-Yon are known as Buxéens.

See also
Communes of the Essonne department

References

External links

Mayors of Essonne Association 

Communes of Essonne